The following are the national records in athletics in Djibouti maintained by its national athletics federation: Fédération Djiboutienne d'Athlétisme (FDA).

Outdoor

Key to tables:
 

+ = en route to a longer distance

h = hand timing

NWI = no wind information

Men

Women

Indoor

Men

Women

Notes

References
General
World Athletics Statistic Handbook 2022: National Outdoor Records
World Athletics Statistic Handbook 2022: National Indoor Records
Specific

External links

Djibouti
Athletics
Records